Long Caye is an island  off the coast of Belize.

References

External links 
Long Caye (Belize)

Uninhabited islands of Belize